Dr. Raymundo Santiago Punongbayan (13 June 1937 – 28 April 2005) was the former director of the Philippine Institute of Volcanology and Seismology (PHIVOLCS) from 1983 to 2002. Punongbayan became popular after handling two well-known calamities, the 1990 Luzon earthquake and the 1991 Pinatubo eruption. PHIVOLCS is the government agency in charge of conducting volcanic and earthquake monitoring in order to generate data that could be used to predict volcanic eruptions and earthquake occurrences.

Education 
Raymundo Punongbayan studied his secondary education at Florentino Torres High School in Tondo, Manila. Punongbayan graduated from the University of the Philippines (Diliman) in 1960 with a degree of Bachelor of Science in Geology and earned his Ph.D. at the University of Colorado in 1972.

Professional and family life 
From 1975 to 1982, he had multiple roles. First as Associate Professor of Structural Geology in the University of the Philippines from 1975 to 1982. Then became a Director of the Mines Research Division in Philippine Council for Agriculture, Aquatic and Natural Resources Research and Development (PCARRD) in 1977 to 1982. While in the 1978, he was the President/Gen. Manager of Synergistic Consultants, Inc. Afterwards, he became a Professor of Geology at University of the Philippines in 1982.

He was then headed as the Director of the Philippine Institute of Volcanology and Seismology (PHIVOLCS) from 1982 until his death in 2005.

His reputation was known globally. Hence, Dr. Punongbayan was considered as a respected figure in the volcanology and seismology community.

All throughout his career, he had plenty of accomplishments such as: a licensed geologist, professor, consultant, public servant and author of numerous scientific papers about geophysics and more than 50 books, community organizer and participant in dozens of international conventions for research preventions of natural hazards, and a notable expert in volcanology, geology, disaster preparedness and seismology.

A former governor of the Philippine National Red Cross, "RSP", as many of his colleagues and friends known him, became a member of the task force of the Development of Earthquake and Tsunami Disaster Prevention Master Plan for the Asia-Pacific  Region and Philippine's representative in the ASEAN Committee on Science and Technology (COST) Sub-Committee on Meteorology and Geophysics .

Punongbayan's effort of close monitoring of the volcano and information campaign to apprise persons in the affected towns of Mt. Pinatubo's impending eruption had saved thousands of lives in 1991.

Dr. Punongbayan was also a father of four.

Recognition 
Punongbayan received two presidential awards in 1992 and 1996, the Pagasa Award for Public Service in 1994, the Unit Award for Excellence of Service granted by the United States Department of the Interior in 1991, and the United Nations Sasakawa Award for Disaster Reduction in 2001.

In April 2003 he was awarded the Sergey Soloviev Medal of 2003 by the European Geophysical Society for his exceptional research and assessment of natural hazards. He had been only the fifth scientist to receive this prestigious award. Established by the Interdisciplinary Working Group on Natural Hazards in recognition of seismology and tsunami research expert Sergey Soloviev's achievements, the medal is given to scientists who have made special contributions to the proper assessment and mitigation of hazards for the protection of human life and socioeconomic systems. Soloviev gained worldwide recognition as an authority in these fields and was a courageous advocate of the principles of international cooperation.

Death 
At the time of his death, he was serving as a member of the Philippine National Red Cross Board of Governors. Shortly after noon on April 28, 2005, Punongbayan and eight others died in a helicopter crash at Gabaldon, Nueva Ecija. The passengers in the Philippine Air Force (PAF) Huey chopper No. 324 were him, four staff members of Philippine Institute of Volcanology and Seismology (Phivolcs) and four Air Force crew members. They were on a mission to assess the area as part of the disaster preparedness operations program of the government and were also looking for possible resettlement for people displaced by flash floods and landslides.

References

External links
 Profile of Raymundo Punongbayan
 PHIVOLCS
 Sergey Soloviev Medallist - 2003

Filipino volcanologists
Seismologists
People from Manila
1937 births
2005 deaths
Victims of helicopter accidents or incidents
University of the Philippines Diliman alumni
Victims of aviation accidents or incidents in the Philippines